Chen Min (born November 1962) is a Chinese famous writer, editor, commentator. He wrote under the pen name of Xiao Shu.

Biography 
Chen Min was born in Yilong County, Sichuan in 1962. He graduated from Sun Yat-sen University. Chen worked on a series of non-fiction novels – History of the First Sound, The Truth of Liu Wencai. In 2000, his works have been suppressed. In 2005, he was expelled from Beijing. In 2011, he was dismissed from Southern Weekly.

Works

References

1962 births
Living people
Writers from Nanchong
Chinese dissidents
People's Republic of China novelists